The SS Connemara was a twin screw steamer, 272 feet long, 35 broad and 14 deep with a gross register tonnage of 1106. She sank on the night of 3 November 1916 at the entrance to Carlingford Lough, Louth, Ireland after being hit amidships by the coalship Retriever. 97 people died that night and the only survivor was James Boyle – a fireman on the Retriever and former caretaker of Warrenpoint Town Hall and a non-swimmer.

The captain on the Connemara was Captain G. H. Doeg. The captain on the Retriever was Patrick O'Neill. Both men were experienced seamen and the accident was attributed to the atrocious weather conditions on the night.

SS Connemara facts & figures 
 Ship Type:	Twin screw steamer
 Captain:	GH Doeg
 Second Mate:	?
 Tonnage:	1106 gross register tons
 Built By:	Denny Brothers of Dunbarton in 1897
 Owners:	London and North-Western Railway Company
 Length:	
 Beam:	
 Draught:	
 Crew:		30 (all from Holyhead in Wales)
 Cargo:	51 passengers (and livestock)

Retriever facts & figures 

 Ship Type: 	Steel screw, three mast steamer
 Captain:	Patrick O'Neill	from Kilkeel
 Second Mate:	Joseph O'Neill (Captain's son)
 Tonnage:	483 gross register tons
 Built By:	Ailsa Shipbuilding Company in 1899
 Owners:	Clanrye Shipping Company
 Length:	
 Beam:	
 Draught:	
 Crew:		9 (all from Newry except the sole survivor James Boyle who was from Summerhill in Warrenpoint)
 Cargo:	Coal

Previous accidents 

Both the Connemara and the Retriever had been in separate collisions with other ships before the fatal accident:
 The Connemara sank the Liverpool vessel Marquis of Bute on 20 March 1910.
 Similarly the Retriever sank the Spanish ship the Lista at Garston dock on 31 August 1912.

The accident itself 

 Accident Date & time:		3 November 1916
 Conditions:			Gale force winds from southwest against a strong ebb tide of some 8 knots. Mountainous seas & dark conditions.
 Retriever Origin: 		Left Garston at 4 a.m. on Friday
 Retriever Destination:	Newry
 Connemara Origin:		Left Greenore (her berth) at 8 p.m.
 Connemara Destination:	Holyhead

The outbound Connemara met the inbound Retriever approximately a half-mile beyond the Carlingford bar. The bar in Carlingford is marked by Haulbowline lighthouse. Beyond the bar is the "cut" or channel, which in Carlingford's case is very narrow, being only about 300 yards wide. This lack of space allows for very little manoeuvrability for passing vessels.
Both vessels were showing dimmed lights, for fear of U-boats. Their masters were on their respective bridges, and there was no evidence to indicate they were not alert.

The watch at the Haulbowline lighthouse, seeing the ships too close for comfort, fired off rockets in warning.

However, the atrocious conditions had caused the Retrievers cargo to list. She was fighting both wind, tide and cargo inertia. She hit the Connemara on the port side, penetrating her hull to the funnel. Immediately Master O' Neill reversed engines and the Retriever swung wide. The Connemara however was terribly ripped below the waterline on the port side, from bow to amidships. She sank within minutes, her boilers exploding on contact with the cold water.

The Retriever, with her bow stove in, took about 20 minutes to sink about 200 yards from the Connemara. Her boilers also exploded on contact with the water.

 The sole survivor: James Boyle 
 From Summerhill in Warrenpoint
 He was a fireman and was also the caretaker of Warrenpoint Town Hall 
 Was below deck of the Retriever at the time of the accident
 A non-swimmer! (sic)
 He clung precariously to an upturned boat and avoiding being dashed against the rocks
 Found exhausted by William Hanna (the son of a farmer at Cranfield) and Tom Crutchley
 21 at the time of the accident
 Lived for another 50 years in Warrenpoint
 Refused to discuss the tragedy until interviewed by television as an elderly man
 Died: 19 April 1967

 The aftermath 

 97 fatalities
 1 sole survivor
 Shorelines littered with corpses, dead animals and flotsam and jetsam
 58 bodies found the next morning
 The other bodies washed up over the following weeks from Cranfield to Kilkeel
 Many corpses were badly mutilated & burned (due to the boilers exploding)
 Unidentified were buried in a mass grave in Kilkeel
 The inquest was held on 6 November in Kilkeel
 Coroner and members of the Jury journeyed to the scene of the tragedy to view the wreckage and the bodies that had been collected
 James Boyle gave his evidence breaking down several times
 The verdict was death by drowning caused by the collision of the ships

 Passengers' stories 

There are 97 stories from that night. A very small selection are here:

 Patrick Conlon, a Dundalk railwayman, was travelling to Wigan with two female cousins – Mrs Lilly Fillingham (plus her 2 children Robert and Jane) and Miss Maggie Glassbrook. His body was initially misidentified as he was wearing the jacket of his brother Tommy.
 There were many young female victims. They were more than likely travelling over to England to work in the munitions factories during World War I.
 Mr Patrick J. Kearney, and his sister, Miss Catherine Kearney, children of the Principal of Drumilly National School, Whitecross were waiting at the Edward St Station in Newry. Mr Kearney had recently completed his training in Waterford for national school teaching, Miss Kearney assisted her father in the school. They were going to meet a married sister who was coming from America. While waiting for the train to Greenore they were told by Sergeant Fitzpatrick, who was always on duty at the station, that the Greenore boat on which they meant to embark might not sail as the night was so rough. After some hesitation Mr Kearney tossed a penny on the Waiting Room table and on the strength of the result decided to make the journey.
 Rose Anne Maguire aged 25 yrs and her sister Margaret Alice (Maggie) Maguire age 19 years were born on a mountain farm located in Aughoo, Co Fermanagh.  Their parents were Philip and Mary Maguire and they had had 10 children by 1911. The older girl had been working in America but came home to collect her younger sister to take her to America. Unfortunately their names were never officially recorded. They were travelling to connect with a New York bound ship in Liverpool. Rose was already living in the states and had come to bring Margaret Alice over. Rose was due to be married and was meeting her fiance in Liverpool. He travelled on to the States but returned to visit Fermanagh in the 1970s and contacted Roses brother Patrick Joseph Maguire. In all the years he still remembered the girl he had loved 60 years before.

 Memorial & poetry 

 In Dublin, the tragedy inspired a 16-year-old schoolboy, C.A. McWilliam, to write a poem – The Collision of the Connemara and Retriever
 On 3 November 1981 the pupils of Kilkeel High School erected a stone memorial in Kilkeel Graveyard in memory of the victims of the tragedy.
 Listen to the Song 'Lovely Alice' The Connemara and the Retriever song' 'written by Pauline McQuaid Shields, the great granddaughter of James and Alice Curran on Youtube. James Curran was a passenger on the Connemara and died in the disaster on 3 November 1916.

References

External links 
The sinking of the Connemara in Carlingford Lough
Irishships.com
BBC Information

Passenger ships of the United Kingdom
Ships built on the River Clyde
World War I shipwrecks in the Atlantic Ocean
Steamships of the United Kingdom
History of County Louth
Maritime incidents in 1910
Maritime incidents in Ireland
Maritime incidents in 1916
1916 in Ireland
1916 disasters in the United Kingdom
Ships sunk in collisions
Ships of the London and North Western Railway
1896 ships
Shipwrecks of Ireland